The Arc card is a contactless smart card and automated fare collection system being introduced to transit services in the Edmonton Metropolitan Region. The initial launch started in the last week of August, 2021, when U-Pass holders began receiving Arc Cards from their respective institutions. A pilot-testing period with 500 adult fare users began on 1 January, 2022, and the system opened to all adult fare-paying passengers on November 21, 2022. Discounted fare users and special groups will be onboarded to the Arc system at some point in 2023 during phase three, with the specific timeframe depending on the results of the previous phases.

History 
In 2003, Edmonton installed new fare vending machines in its LRT network which were capable of accepting credit cards and smart cards. City administration wrote a business case for a 'civic smart card' that could be used for transit, libraries, recreation centres, and other city services, but funding was not allocated to move ahead with the project. Edmonton Transit Service (ETS) later completed a two-month pilot of smart fare technology from Cubic Transport Systems on its LRT network. Known as "ETS Blue," the pilot was approved in 2007 at a cost of $600,000, and involved 200 staff members from the University of Alberta using modified OneCards to tap the readers in the fare vending machines when entering and leaving LRT stations. Participants did not pay their fare during the pilot, which occurred in summer 2009. The demonstration was highly successful, with 99% of participants using their card "all the time" on the LRT, over 25% indicating that they used transit more frequently than before they had a smart card, 100% replacing some of their vehicle trips with LRT usage, and over 90% being satisfied with the technology and wanting it to be expanded across the transit network. Despite this success however, ETS Blue was not trialed beyond August 2009 or expanded to include ETS bus routes. In a report published after the pilot's conclusion, the city identified smart fare technology as a top priority for the Capital Region transit network plan.

Edmonton began looking into smart fare technology once again in 2014, with ETS planning to install the necessary equipment by 2015. In 2015, the Alberta government approved funding for a region-wide smart fare program which was projected to cost approximately $51.6 million. Edmonton, St. Albert, and Strathcona County also contributed funds towards the program. Vix Technology was selected to install the smart fare equipment. Edmonton Mayor Don Iveson expressed hope for smart fare to become publicly available in 2016. The system was later expected to start operating in the second half of 2020, but the launch was later delayed until 2021. The project was further delayed by the closure of the Canada-US border as a result of the COVID-19 pandemic.

The Arc card brand was unveiled on June 8, 2021. Applications were launched for the Arc pilot, which was to include a sample of adult fare-paying riders, U-Pass students, public and catholic school students, and transit staff from Edmonton, St. Albert, and Strathcona County. The pilot was rescheduled for January 2022, and involved 500 adult fare-paying riders from the participating municipalities. Arc opened for adult fare-paying riders on November 21, 2022, except for local services in Fort Saskatchewan and Leduc. The latter two transit services will implement Arc in 2023—the same year that other fare groups are planned to transition to Arc.

Card use 

Arc cards and Arc tickets are available for purchase at fare vending machines located at major destinations throughout the region, including transit centres and LRT stations, certain recreation centres, and the Edmonton International Airport. These machines accept credit and debit cards, and cash. Riders are able to reload their cards at fare vending machines and online, and if they register their cards, they can also enable 'auto-load' so that their balance is topped up whenever it falls below $10. Arc cards can also be purchased and reloaded at certain municipal buildings and retail stores throughout the region, but cards can only be registered on the Arc website. Each rider's balance is stored on their online account rather than on their card itself, enabling riders to continue using their balance after replacing lost or stolen cards—as long as their card was registered. 

The Arc program includes daily and monthly fare capping; when someone spends above a certain daily or monthly limit, they are able to ride for the remaining duration of that period for free. Discounted fare groups, such as seniors and low income fares, will have lower fare caps than the regular adult fare caps. When a rider taps their card while boarding, they are able to transfer to other routes for free within a 90-minute window. If someone does not tap their card while exiting, they may be charged a higher fare than they would have otherwise paid. When paper passes and transfers are eventually phased out, riders will still be able to pay their fare with cash.

Arc tickets work similarly to Arc cards, but instead of having a reloadable balance, they are valid for unlimited usage within a set time period and cannot be renewed. Region-wide tickets can be purchased in 90-minute and 24-hour increments, and riders can also buy cheaper tickets that are only valid on one service (such as St. Albert local, or Fort Saskatchewan commuter). The timed window for tickets does not start until their first tap, and tickets that are not used expire after one year.

Fare caps 
Arc utilizes the first regional fare capping system in Canada. Member transit agencies set a flat fare for each service they provide (such as local, commuter, and paratransit services), and passengers using Arc cards pay that fare each time they tap their card. All transit services set their own monthly fare caps, and Edmonton Transit Service also offers daily fare caps. If someone reaches their fare cap before the month is over, then they can ride transit for free for the remainder of the month. Although fare caps are not lower than the cost of monthly passes, proponents of fare capping argue that it is more equitable than monthly passes, since fare capping eliminates the need to pay the full price of a pass up front.

Arc is only available to adult fare-paying passengers as of November, 2022, and other fare groups will be added in 2023.

Local services

Commuter services

Rollout 

The Arc system is currently in phase three of a four phase rollout.

Phase one 
Phase one, also known as the early launch, involves the transition of the U-Pass system to Arc Card delivery. Previously, U-Passes were delivered via special stickers placed on student-ID cards. Students at MacEwan University, Norquest College, and the University of Alberta use Arc Cards, while students attending the Northern Alberta Institute of Technology (NAIT) have student-ID cards with Arc Card technology integrated into them;  making NAIT the first post-secondary institution in Canada to have such an arrangement. 

Students at NAIT and Norquest began using the Arc system in August 2021, while MacEwan University and the University of Alberta began distributing Arc Cards in September 2021. All four schools completed the transition to Arc-based U-Passes by 1 October, 2021, and students must now scan their cards instead of showing transit staff their student IDs.

Prior to August 2021, the pilot was intended to involve up to 600 adult-fare riders, transit staff, and U-Pass holders who would test the various features of the Arc system during their regular commutes.

Phase two 
Phase two of the rollout started on 1 January, 2022. It includes 500 adult-fare paying users; all other adult fare riders will continue to purchase normal tickets and passes. The results of this testing phase will be reviewed in summer 2022, and it will be decided whether the system is ready to support riders who pay the regular adult fare, or if the rollout should be further delayed to address more issues. The pilot results were initially reviewed at the end of March, 2022, but the rollout was delayed so that the problems encountered by participants could be fixed.

Phase three 
Arc opened to adult fare-paying riders on November 21, 2022. Some member municipalities, including Edmonton, Strathcona County, and St. Albert, marked the launch by distributing free Arc Cards for a limited time.

Phase four 
Phase four will take place in 2023, with the specific date being dependent on the outcome of phase three. It will include senior and youth-fare paying users, junior and senior high school students, riders who are eligible for low-income passes, and people who use DATS or regional paratransit services. Usage of Arc Cards and Tickets will initially remain optional for all fare-paying users (excluding U-Pass riders), but this is subject to change at a later date.

Participation 
The following transit services use Arc:

 Beaumont Transit
 Edmonton Transit Service
 Edmonton Metropolitan Transit Services Commission
 Fort Sask Transit (starting in 2023)
 Leduc Transit (starting in 2023)
 St. Albert Transit
 Strathcona County Transit
 Spruce Grove Transit

See also 

List of smart cards

References

External links 

 

Contactless smart cards
Fare collection systems in Canada